WOOF (560 AM / 100.1 FM, "The Ball") is a radio station licensed to serve Dothan, Alabama, United States.  The station is owned by WOOF, Inc.

WOOF broadcasts a sports talk format.  The station features locally produced live call in shows, highschool play by play, Troy University football and syndicated programming from Paul Finebaum and ESPN Radio. The station began airing Foxsports just before July 4, 2016. In late January 2010, WOOF, Inc. purchased the 100.1 translator (W261AT), which was previously relaying the WEEL (700 AM) signal.

References

External links

OOF
Sports radio stations in the United States
Houston County, Alabama
Radio stations established in 1947
1947 establishments in Alabama